Mount Ninji and Da Nice Time Kid (commonly referred to as simply "Mount Ninji") is the fourth studio album by Die Antwoord. It was released on 16 September 2016 through streaming platforms and as a digital download.

Track listing

Notes
"We Have Candy" features Ninja reciting dialogue from John Carpenter's Big Trouble in Little China.
"Lil Tommy Terror", who appears in the songs "Wings on My Penis" and "U Like Boobies?", was only 6 years old when those songs were recorded. His identity is unknown.
"I Don't Care" is a cover of Soviet children song "Если с другом вышел в путь" by Vladimir Shainsky.

Charts

Weekly charts

Year-end charts

References

Die Antwoord albums
Alternative hip hop albums by South African artists
2016 albums
Rave albums